General Brett may refer to:

Devol Brett (1923–2010), U.S. Air Force lieutenant general
George Brett (general) (1886–1963), U.S. Army Air Forces lieutenant general
Lloyd Milton Brett (1856–1927), U.S. Army brigadier general
Sereno E. Brett (1891–1952), U.S. Army brigadier general